Fangyan is a town under the administration of Yongkang, Zhejiang, China. , it administers the following two residential neighborhoods and 24 villages:

Neighborhoods
Fangyan
Paixi

Villages
Chenglu Village
Yanhou Village
Yanshang Village
Yanxia Village
Xi Village
Dayuan Village
Houshantou Village
Changkeng Village
Guzhufan Village
Xianyan Village
Liangtoumen Village
Paixi Village
Xianpen Village
Tongkeng Village
Xianghuli Village
Dusong Village
Xiazhai Village
Wenlou Village
Shangliye Village
Chengliwang Village
Jinzhu Village
Houqian Village
Xiangmotang Village
Sanchuan Village

References 

Towns of Jinhua
Yongkang, Zhejiang